Kokua Hospitality is a property management firm affiliated with The Chartres Lodging Group, LLC, of San Francisco, California, United States.

History
The word "Kokua" (pronounced "koh-kooh-ah") is Hawaiian for "to serve, assist, cooperate and pursue knowledge". The company was founded in San Francisco and is currently headquartered in Chicago, Illinois. 

Kokua Hospitality was originally an independent hotel management company created by investors Rob Kline and Maki Bara of the Chartres Lodging Group, LLC. The firm announced their merger with Filament Hospitality, effective September 23, 2019. The new company, Sightline Hospitality, combines each company's expertise to create a hybrid third-party hotel management company for unique, branded, soft branded, big box independent, and boutique properties.

The company's history of hotel management includes the turnaround of distressed properties, and the restoration of buildings including Inn of Chicago, DoubleTree by Hilton Chicago Magnificent Mile, the Powell Hotel, Hyatt Place Waikiki Beach, Embassy Suites Baltimore Inner Harbor and Grand Historic Venue.

Kokua branded
Hilton Hotels
Starwood Hotels
Choice Hotels International
Hyatt Hotels

Kokua independent
The Axiom Hotel (formerly the Powell Hotel), San Francisco

References

External links

Companies based in Chicago
Hospitality companies of the United States